The Pinch River, a perennial river of the Snowy River catchment, is located in the Snowy Mountains region of New South Wales, Australia.

Course and features
The Pinch River rises west of Paradise Hill in remote alpine country within The Snowy Mountains Range, part of the Great Dividing Range, contained within the Kosciuszko National Park. The river flows generally south southeast, then west, then west southwest, and then southeast, before reaching its confluence with the Snowy River below the Charcoal Range. The river descends  over its  course.

See also

 List of rivers of New South Wales (L-Z)
 List of rivers of Australia
 Rivers of New South Wales

References

 

Rivers of New South Wales
Snowy Mountains